Atko Väikmeri (born 25 December 1976) is an Estonian football coach and former football defender. He played for several clubs in his native country, including JK Tervis Pärnu.

He has worked as a coach for JK Tallinna Kalev's youth teams, women's team and assisted their U21 team. From 2020 he works as a coach for FC Nõmme United youth teams.

International career
Väikmeri earned his first official cap for the Estonia national football team on 19 May 1995, when Estonia played Latvia at the Baltic Cup 1995. He obtained a total number of two caps.

References

External links
 
 
 

1976 births
Living people
Estonian footballers
Estonia international footballers
Association football defenders
Estonian football managers